Casket Garden is an EP released by Dismember. It was released in 1995 by Nuclear Blast. The song "Casket Garden" is also the ninth track on Dismember's third album Massive Killing Capacity.

EP Track listing
 "Casket Garden" – 3:36
 "Wardead" – 2:27
 "Justifiable Homicide" – 3:18

Credits
 Matti Kärki - Vocals
 Fred Estby - Drums
 David Blomqvist - Lead guitar
 Richard Cabeza - Bass
 Robert Sennebäck - Guitar

References

Dismember (band) EPs
1995 EPs
Nuclear Blast EPs